Medieval German literature refers to the literature of Medieval Germany.

It can be subdivided into two main periods:

Old High German literature (750–1050) is the product of the monasteries and is almost exclusively religious in nature
Middle High German literature (1050–1350) is the product of the noble courts and focuses on knightly exploits and courtly love

See also
History of German literature

 
German literature by period